Sir David Harrel  (25 March 1841 – 12 May 1939) was an Irish police officer and civil servant.

Harrel was born in Mount Pleasant, County Down, the son of a land agent. He was educated at the Royal Naval School, Gosport, but was too old to join the Royal Navy as a Midshipman when he took the exam and instead joined the Merchant Navy. In 1859, he left to join the Royal Irish Constabulary. In 1879 he became a resident magistrate in County Mayo and in 1883 was appointed Chief Commissioner of the Dublin Metropolitan Police. Although himself a Protestant, he had good relations with the Roman Catholic Church and was a member of several bodies which worked to relieve the poverty of the Irish peasantry.

In 1893, Harrel was appointed Under-Secretary for Ireland, a post he held until 1902, when he retired due to ill-health. He continued to sit on many tribunals and voluntary bodies.

Harrel was appointed Knight Commander of the Order of the Bath (KCB) in 1895, Knight Commander of the Royal Victorian Order (KCVO) in 1900, and Knight Grand Cross of the Order of the British Empire (GBE). He was appointed to the Privy Council of Ireland, entitling him to the style "The Right Honourable". In the 1920 New Year Honours, he was appointed Knight Grand Cross of the Order of the Bath (GCB), having served as chairman of the Interim Court of Arbitration on industrial questions from 1918 to 1919.

Harrel's son, William Vesey Harrel, served as Assistant Commissioner of the Dublin Metropolitan Police from 1902 to 1914.

Arms

Footnotes

References

Biography, Oxford Dictionary of National Biography
Obituary, The Times, 13 May 1939

External links
 

1841 births
1939 deaths
People from County Down
Royal Irish Constabulary officers
Chief Commissioners of the Dublin Metropolitan Police
British Merchant Navy officers
Irish knights
Irish sailors
Under-Secretaries for Ireland
Knights Grand Cross of the Order of the Bath
Knights Grand Cross of the Order of the British Empire
Knights Commander of the Royal Victorian Order
Members of the Privy Council of Ireland